Klüvers Big Band is a Danish big band. It was formed in 1977 by a group of young music students under the leadership of Jens Klüver. Since then the orchestra has worked with a long line of international and Danish soloists. It has recently toured in Europe with Kurt Elling.

In 2002 Klüver received the Ben Webster Prize in recognition of his work with the big band.

In 2012 Klüver retired, handing over to Lars Møller, at which point the band was renamed the Aarhus Jazz Orchestra.

Soloists
Klüvers Big Band has performed with a long line of international soloists:

 Abdullah Ibrahim, Piano 
 Afonso Corea, Percussion 
 Bernard Fowler, Vocal
 Bill Dobbins, Piano, Arranger 
 Bill Warfield,  Trumpet, Arranger 
 Bob Berg, Tenor 
 Bob Mintzer Tenor, Arranger 
 Bob Rockwell Tenor 
 Bobby Shew, Trumpet 
 Butch Lacy, Piano, Arranger 
 Byron Stripling, Trumpet 
 Carmen Bradford Vocal 
 Clark Terry Trumpet 
 Dave Samuels Vibes
 Deborah Brown, Vocal 
 Dee Dee Bridgewater, Vocal 
 Dena DeRose Piano, Vocal 
 Dennis Mackrel, Drums, Arranger - Se galleri
 Ed Neumeister Trombone, Arranger 
 Ed Partyka, arranger 
 Ed Thigpen, Drums 
 Emanuel Rahim, Percussion 
 Ernie Wilkins, Tenor, Arranger 
 Fred Sturm, Arranger 
 Gary Bartz, Alto 
 Gregory Boyd Steel Drums & Vocal 
 Harry Sweets Edison, Trumpet 
 Harvey Wainapel, Alto, Tenor 
 Horace Parlan, Piano, Arranger 
 Jerry Bergonzi, Tenor 
 Joe Henderson, Tenor 
 Joe Lovano, Tenor 
 John Abercrombie, Guitar 
 John Surman, Soprano 
 Jon Hendricks, Vocal 
 Judi Silvano, Vocal 
 Ken Peplowski, Clarinet, Tenor 
 Kenny Werner, Piano, Arranger 
 Kurt Elling, Vocal - Se galleri
 Lee Konitz, Alto 
 Madeline Eastman, Vocal 
 Marcio Bahia, Drums 
 Mark Vinci, Alto, Arranger 
 Matt Harris, Piano, Arranger 
 Michael Abene, Piano, arranger 
 Mike Nock, Piano, Arranger 
 Mulgrew Miller, Piano
 Nicholas Urie, Arranger
 Paquito D'Rivera, Alto, Clarinet 
 Pete Yellin Alto, Arranger 
 Richard Boone Trombone 
 Rob McConnel Arranger 
 Robert Routch, French Horn 
 Slide Hampton Trombone, Arranger 
 Stacey Kent Vocal 
 Terell Stafford, Trumpet
 Thad Jones, Arranger 
 Tim Hagans, Trumpet, Arranger 
 Tim Ries - Tenor, Soprano
 Tom Kirkpatrick, Trumpet 
 Tommy Smith Tenor 
 Vincent Herring, Alto 
 Wycliffe Gordon, Trombone, Arranger

Discography
Records include:
 Grew's Tune (2012; with Mulgrew Miller on piano)
 Veronica Mortensen - I'm the Girl
 Hot House - Thilo Meets Mackrel (with Danish saxophonist Jesper Thilo and American drummer and arranger Dennis Mackrel)
 Otto Brandenburg Galla Memorial (2008)
 I Had A Ball - Greatest & More (2007)
 Love Being Here
 Other People Other Plans (with Hans Ulrik as soloist and composer)
 Reflections
 Better Believe It
 Good Times
 A Tribute To Duke (1999; Vince Herring as a guest soloist on saxophone)
 Silver Street (1998)
 Live In Tivoli (1997)
 Count On It (1995; with the vocalist Carmen Bradford)
 The Heat's On (1994; with the violinist Finn Ziegler and the saxophonist Jesper Thilo)
 Jasmine (1993)

See also
 Danish jazz

References

Danish jazz ensembles
Big bands
Musical groups established in 1977